Daniël Rijaard (born November 16, 1976) is a Dutch Antilles footballer who plays for SVV Scheveningen and Netherlands Antilles. He is a defender who plays as a fullback on the right side of the pitch.

Club career
Rijaard's career began when he signed a professional contract with Excelsior Rotterdam, making his first first-team appearance in 1995, at the age of 18. He was a regular in the team immediately and became one of Excelsior's key players in the following years. In total he played seven straight seasons at the Rotterdam club before making a move towards Eredivisie participants ADO Den Haag. Again he was a regular member in the first team right from the start and played nearly all matches in the competition. In his third season at ADO Den Haag he found himself on the bench more often and at the end of 2005 he went back to Excelsior on loan. With this team he won the championship in the Eerste Divisie, which secured the team a place in the Eredivisie for 2006-07. After the season, he returned to ADO where he was no longer secure to be lined-up in the first team.
When ADO promoted to the Eredivisie in the 2007-08 season, Rijaard did not receive a new contract. Therefore, he left ADO and became an amateur footballer at Scheveningen.

International career
Rijaard made his debut for the Netherlands Antilles in a March 2004 World Cup qualifying match against Antigua and Barbuda.

References
adodenhaag.nl
clubachterdeduinen.nl
vi.nl

1976 births
Living people
Dutch Antillean footballers
Netherlands Antilles international footballers
Association football defenders
ADO Den Haag players
Excelsior Rotterdam players
Footballers from Rotterdam
SVV Scheveningen players